Wolfbiker is the fourth full-length album by American band Evergreen Terrace and their first release on Metal Blade Records. It was released on July 24, 2007. It is the band's first album to feature drummer Kyle Mims.

Track listing
All music and lyrics by Evergreen Terrace, except for track 4 by Evergreen Terrace and Jared Boice.

Notes
"Chaney Can't Quite Riff Like Helmet's Page Hamilton" was the first single and first music video for the album. It was produced by Brian Thompson and 1171 Productions. The video included loads of fans and friends from Jacksonville and surrounding areas. The video premiered Saturday, October 13th on MTV2's Headbanger's Ball. The song was named after the closing quote of a negative review of Sincerity Is an Easy Disguise in This Business by Alternative Press.
At the 2:05 mark during "Starter," there is a goof-up. While Craig is singing clean during the verse, Andrew is screaming the same lyrics in the background. However, during the line, "My Capulet is still a step away," Andrew incorrectly screams "My Capulet is just a step away," which was the line Craig sung during the first verse before changing it up in the second.

Personnel
Evergreen Terrace
 Andrew Carey – unclean vocals
 Craig Chaney – lead guitar, clean vocals
 Josh James – rhythm guitar, backing vocals
 Jason Southwell – bass
 Kyle Mims – drums

Additional
Jared Boice – guitar solo on track 4
Daryl Phenneger – producer, tracking
Jason Livermore – mastering, mixing
Shaun Thurston – cover art
Brian J. Ames – layout design
Tim Lambesis – A&R

Cultural references
The band is known for referring to pop culture in their titles, lyrics, and soundbites.

References

2007 albums
Evergreen Terrace albums
Metal Blade Records albums